Tijjani Muhammad-Bande, GCON OFR (born 7 December 1957) is a Nigerian diplomat, academic and political scientist who was the President of the United Nations General Assembly of 74th session from 17 September 2019 to 15 September 2020. He previously served as vice president from September 2016. 

He was Nigeria's Permanent Representative to the United Nations in Geneva from 2018 to 2021. From 2010 to 2016, he was the director general of the National Institute of Policy and Strategic Studies in Kuru, Nigeria, and was the Vice Chancellor of the Usmanu Danfodio University from 2004 to 2009. In January 2021, he was re-listed by President Buhari as the Permanent Representative to the United Nations, New York.

Early life
Muhammad-Bande was born and educated in Zagga, a town in present-day Kebbi State.

Education 
He attended Ahmadu Bello University in Zaria where he received a bachelors degree in political science in 1979 before proceeding to Boston University, where he graduated with a Master of Arts in Political Science in 1981. Muhammad-Bande received a Ph.D in Political Science from the University of Toronto in 1987.

Career
In the 1980s, he taught at the Usman Danfodio University in Sokoto and rose to the rank of professor in 1998. Between 2000 to 2004, Bande served as the Director-General of the African Training and Research Centre in Administration for Development in Tangier, Morocco. Between 2004 and 2009, he served as Vice Chancellor of Usman Danfodio University before being appointed Director-General of Nigeria's National Institute for Policy and Strategic Studies, a position he held from 2010 to 2016.

Personal life 
He is married with four children.

See also 
 List of Ahmadu Bello University alumni

References

1957 births
Living people
Nigerian diplomats
Boston University College of Arts and Sciences alumni
Ahmadu Bello University alumni
Permanent Representatives of Nigeria to the United Nations
University of Toronto alumni
20th-century Nigerian people
21st-century Nigerian people
Presidents of the United Nations General Assembly